Church Island is a medieval Christian monastery and National Monument located in Lough Currane, Ireland.

Location

It is also known as Inis Uasail ("Upper Island").

History

The monastery on Lough Currane claims its foundation from Saint Fionán Cam (6th century AD).

The oak church (dairthech) was replaced in the 12th century by a Romanesque stone building, some of which survives.

Description
There is a stone church, a clochán (perhaps a hospitium) and two further cells for other monks. There are three altars, 11 cross slabs and pillar stones.

The church contains a relief carving of a musician playing a lyre.

References

Christian monasteries in the Republic of Ireland
Religion in County Kerry
Archaeological sites in County Kerry
National Monuments in County Kerry